AbdulRahman Ado Ibrahim (born February 7, 1929) is the fourth traditional ruler and current Ohinoyi of Ebiraland, a traditional state with headquarters in Okene, Kogi State, Middle Belt, Nigeria. He is a son of the second attah (now "ohinoyi") of Ebiraland, Ibrahim Onoruoiza, of the Omadivi clan, who reigned 1917–1954.

Early years and education 
Ibrahim was born on February 7, 1929. He attended both western nursery and Quranic schools, and went on to conclude his primary education in 1940 at the Native Authority (NA) primary school in Okene, Northern Region (now Kogi State). He, began his secondary school education at Ondo Boys High School and later on moved to Oduduwa College, where he graduated in 1949. In 1954, he obtained a bachelor's degree in Economics from the London School of Economics and a master's degree from Harvard Business School in 1959.

Enthronement 
Following the death of Ohinoyi Sanni Omolori of the Ogu clan in 1997, the Lagos-based entrepreneur and son of the second paramount ruler of Ebiraland, AbdulRahman Ado Ibrahim, ascended the Okene throne as the second ohinoyi or fourth independent traditional ruler of Ebiraland on June 2, 1997.

Ibrahim constructed the Azad Palace, named after one of his sons, said to be among the most beautiful in West Africa.

Friction with state government 
Ibrahim was reportedly issued a query by the Kogi State Government, following his inability to grant the Nigerian President Muhammadu Buhari a welcome during the latter's visit to the state, on 29 December 2022. It was reported that a bomb exploded during the president's visit at a mosque close to the palace of the ohinoyi in Okene, killing about three persons. On January 3, 2023, the Nigerian police Department of State Security (DSS) was said to have arrested the bomb blast masterminds who were member of the ISWAP, which released a video a day before the arrests, reportedly stating that the attack was undertaken by “soldiers of the caliphate”. Ibrahim in his reply to the query on 12 January 2022, addressed to the State Commissioner for Local Government and Chieftaincy Affairs, stated that he did not receive an official notification and was unaware of the construction of another palace which was part of the projects to be commissioned by the president, other than the one he had been residing in since his coronation in 1997. In addition, he stated that as he prepared to go to meet the president, the bomb incidence happened and his palace entrance got barricaded, thus his inability to go out and meet the president before the latter left for Lokoja.

Earlier in December 2022, Ibrahim declared his support for Natasha Akpoti-Uduaghan of the PDP vying for the Kogi Central Senatorial District ultimate position. Noteworthy, the state government as of then and currently is being run by an opposition party, the APC.

Royal family
One of Ibrahim's children, Prince Malik Ado-Ibrahim, was as of January 7, 2023, the presidential candidate of the Young Progressives Party (YPP) towards the upcoming elections in Nigeria.

References

External links

Nigerian traditional rulers
People from Kogi State
Ohinoyi of Ebiraland
Living people
1929 births
Ebira people
Alumni of the London School of Economics
Harvard Business School alumni